Jim Gregory is a Republican representing the 80th district in the Pennsylvania House of Representatives. On January 3, 2023, Gregory nominated Mark Rozzi for Speaker of the House, making him the first Independent Speaker in Pennsylvania.

Prior to his political career he was a sportscaster for WTAJ-TV broadcasting from Altoona, PA.  In search of an easier less mentally stimulating job, he went into politics.

Political career

Gregory was elected to represent the 80th district in the Pennsylvania House of Representatives in 2018. He sits on the following committees:
 Aging & Older Adult Services (Secretary)
 Human Services (Secretary)
 Labor & Industry
 Local Government
 Tourism & Recreational Development

Electoral record

References

Republican Party members of the Pennsylvania House of Representatives